The 1970 United States Senate election in Minnesota took place on November 3, 1970. Incumbent Democratic U.S. Senator Eugene McCarthy opted not to seek reelection. Former Democratic U.S. Senator, Vice President and 1968 presidential nominee Hubert Humphrey defeated Republican U.S. Representative Clark MacGregor.

Democratic–Farmer–Labor primary

Candidates

Declared
 Earl D. Craig
 Hubert H. Humphrey, Democratic nominee for President in 1968, former Vice President of the United States (1965-1969), former U.S. Senator (1949-1964)

Results

Republican primary

Candidates

Declared
 John D. Baucom
 Clark MacGregor, U.S. Representative from Minnesota's 3rd congressional district since 1961

Results

General election

Results

See also 
 1970 United States Senate elections

References

Minnesota
1970
1970 Minnesota elections
Hubert Humphrey